Juan Marcelo Toya (born November 18, 1982 in Montevideo, Uruguay), is a Uruguayan association football forward currently playing for Sportivo Belgrano of the Torneo Argentino A in Argentina.

References
 
 

1982 births
Living people
Uruguayan footballers
Uruguayan expatriate footballers
Uruguay international footballers
C.A. Cerro players
Club Nacional de Football players
Liverpool F.C. (Montevideo) players
Uruguay Montevideo players
Real C.D. España players
Tacuarembó F.C. players
Juventud de Las Piedras players
El Tanque Sisley players
Juan Aurich footballers
Club Atlético Colegiales (Argentina) players
Club Atlético Sarmiento footballers
Expatriate footballers in Peru
Expatriate footballers in Argentina
Expatriate footballers in Honduras
Liga Nacional de Fútbol Profesional de Honduras players
Association football forwards